Carales maculicollis is a moth of the family Erebidae. It was described and discovered by Francis Walker in 1855. It is found in Brazil.

References

Phaegopterina
Moths described in 1855